Ed Janus is a writer, independent audio journalist and oral historian.  He has lived in Madison, Wisconsin for over 40 years where he is well known for having brought baseball and world-renowned beers to that city.

Janus was born in Washington, D.C. in 1945 and was graduated from Lake Forest College in 1968 with honors for his thesis on the dramaturgy of political demonstrations. He worked for a year as a community organizer with The West Side Organization and the Southern Christian Leadership Council in Chicago in 1966-67, where he was deeply influenced by Dr. Martin Luther King Jr.

Eschewing an academic career, Janus became a city bus driver in Evanston, Illinois (“the second best job I ever had”) and later a dairy farmer (“the best job I ever had”) in Soldiers Grove, Wisconsin where he and his partners milked 30 cows and plowed, planted and harvested 250 acres.  As he writes in his book, Creating Dairyland :

I got mud, manure, and milk on my boots for the first time in 1973 when I became a novice dairyman on a thirty-acre farm in Crawford County.  And although I no longer wear boots, that milk remains indelibly on my soul.

Janus was a member of the Phoenix Fellowship, a group whose members were well known in Madison as the creators of the Ovens of Brittany and Bakers Rooms, restaurants that changed the landscape of food in Madison.

In the early 1980s Janus led a group that brought professional, small town baseball back to Madison after an absence of 40 years.  Madison Muskies Baseball became more than a game; it became a summertime outlet for community-based  zaniness.  So popular were the games and the zaniness, that CBS Nightly News, CNN and National Public Radio reported on them.

While he served as the general manager of the Muskies, Janus was working on developing a small, local brewery.  At the time (1983–84) there was a mere handful of new local breweries in the U.S.  Janus and his partners decided to create authentic German beers such as might have been brewed in Wisconsin early in the century.  They also wanted a brewery that paid homage to craftsmanship, individual taste and small-scale enterprise.

Since micro-breweries were an unknown business at the time, investors did not know what to make of the idea.  Janus and his partners decided that rather than raising money privately, they would go right to the beer drinking, brewery-loving people of Wisconsin.  In a series of humorous radio and print advertisements and public meetings around Wisconsin, Janus and his partners were able to raise more than $1.5 million from state residents in a most unusual stock offering – an IPO connected only to a business plan, not an ongoing business.  For his efforts, or chutzpah, Janus was nominated by the state securities commissioner for an Arthur Young Wisconsin Entrepreneur of the Year award.  (He received an honorable mention.)

Capital Brewery in Middleton, Wisconsin brewed its first beers in 1986.  In 1998 it was named as the top brewery in the U.S. and seventh best in the world, at the Beverage Testing Institute's World Beer Championships in Chicago.

In 1990, Janus began his career as an interviewer, writer and audio journalist.  Since then he has interviewed hundreds of people on topics covering education policy, the environment, business, health and language.  For example, a program on American dialects and another on the dark sky movement, aired around the world on Voice of America.  Janus has also been heard on Marketplace, and thousands of CDs and websites.

In 1999, Janus created You’re Not Alone: Conversations with Breast Cancer Survivors and Those Who Love Them, a first-person audio book which was awarded top honors by the Audio Publishers Association.   In 2004, the German publishing company Langenscheidt, published Living in the U. S.: Das Praxistraining für Job und Alltag, a series of books and audio interviews with representative Americans created to help Germans understand everyday spoken American English.

In 2006, Janus began to revisit dairy farming by producing a series of first-person audio stories of dairy farmers and cheesemakers for the Wisconsin Milk Marketing Board.   While working on these stories he realized that to tell the story of dairying today, he would also need to tell the remarkable story of how dairying came to Wisconsin and how it transformed the state.

As I put each of these [audio] stories together, I was searching for ways to  place them in a kind of “deeper soil,” a context or understanding that would examine not only what something was—a silo, for example— but also why it was, what problem it had solved and what changes it had wrought. I came to realize that the past is that deeper soil, that  things planted in the past of Wisconsin dairying have grown into our landscape of today and our way of life.

A book, Creating Dairyland, (Wisconsin Historical Society Press, 2011) came out of his exploration of this “deeper soil”; a book that shows how learning to care for cows saved Wisconsin farmers from themselves, transformed them into progressives, created an industry and bequeathed the endearing bucolic landscape to Wisconsin that continues to define the state’s psyche today.

As he writes in the book’s introduction:

Care of the cow has brought prosperity to Wisconsin. And in a very important way, I believe the dairy cow  created Wisconsin—that is, created the Wisconsin we know and love today. For when we drive through Dairyland we take in a scene that truly defines us: the neat barns with their ranks of silos, the undulating green of grasses, and especially the cows, our avatars of contentment. All of this—our farms, their silos and cows; our farmers, their prosperity and their intelligence; all the fields of grass; and our remarkable history—make up what I like to call the book of Dairyland.

During the 160 years since dairy cows began to reshape Wisconsin’s landscape, economics, moral ethic, and way of life, many thousands of men and women have been initiated into a kind of faith: faith that care of the cow and the soil would bring them prosperity, even happiness.

Janus is exploring a number of new projects.  The first, a book, tentatively called Bringing the Enlightenment to Main Street, will tell the story of how Free Masonry transduced the philosophy of the enlightened  liberalism into a way of being and living for millions of American men; citizens of a new liberal-moral democracy.  The second project under consideration is a one-man play called Marcus Aurelius Tonight, a reprise for the venerable Stoic.

References

Lake Forest College alumni
Living people
Businesspeople from Madison, Wisconsin
Year of birth missing (living people)